Chess is a surname. Notable people with the surname include:

Jamar Chess, American music manager
Leonard Chess, record company executive
Lisa Chess, American actress
Marshall Chess (born 1942), American record producer
Mary Chess, perfumer
Phil Chess (born 1921), American record producer
Richard Chess (poet) (born 1953), American poet
Richard B. Chess, American politician
Stanley Chess, American legal commentator
Stella Chess, American child psychiatrist